Renko is a former municipality of Finland. It was consolidated with Hämeenlinna on 2009-01-01.

It is located in the province of Southern Finland and is part of the Tavastia Proper region.

The municipality is unilingually Finnish. The municipality has previously also been known as "Rengo" in Swedish documents, but is today referred to as "Renko" also in Swedish.

References

External links 

Former municipalities of Finland
Hämeenlinna
Populated places disestablished in 2009